A submarine-launched missile is a missile that can be launched from a submarine. They include submarine-launched ballistic missiles (SLBMs) and submarine-launched cruise missiles (SLCMs). SLBMs are launched vertically; some other types are fired through the submarine's torpedo tubes.

List of submarine-launched missiles
 A3SM (Mistral missile) submarine mast VSHORAD system
 A3SM (MICA missile) SLAM
 Blowfish submarine mast VSHORAD system
 BGM-109 Tomahawk
 UGM-109 Tomahawk
 Hyunmoo
 Babur
  Harbah
 BrahMos [Under Development]
 Exocet SM39
 FC/ASW / FMAN/FMC
 MdCN
 IDAS
 Sagarika
 UGM-84 Harpoon
 UGM-89 Perseus (cancelled 1973)
 UUM-44 SUBROC (withdrawn from service 1989)
 UUM-125 Sea Lance (cancelled 1990)
 YJ-82
 P-70 Ametist
 P-500 Bazalt
 P-700 Granit
 RPK-6 Vodopad/RPK-7 Veter
 SS-N-3 Shaddock
 Kalibr
 K-4
 K-5 (Under development)
 K-6 (Under development)

See also
 Submarine-launched ballistic missile
 Submarine-launched cruise missile

Missile types
Naval weapons